The Type 139 patrol trawler was a class of vessel used as a training ship by the Federal German Navy. Both vessels in the class were originally built for the Royal Navy in 1942 as  naval trawlers.

History

Placed on the postwar disposal list, they were sold for mercantile use.

When the Federal German Navy was established in 1956, Dochet and Flint were acquired and classified as Type 139 patrol trawlers. Dochet was named  while Flint became .

Since the days of World War I, Germany had had a tradition of employing patrol trawlers. The type was classified before 1945 as a Vorpostenboot (literally, "outpost boat"). In the Federal German Navy, Eider and Trave were employed as fishery protection vessels and for training with light-caliber guns. Later they were used in radar instruction.

After two decades of service in the West German navy, Eider and Trave were discarded in the mid-1970s. Both Eider and Trave were sold for scrap.

References